The Evergreen Point Floating Bridge, also known as the 520 Bridge and officially the Governor Albert D. Rosellini Bridge, carries Washington State Route 520 across Lake Washington from Seattle to its eastern suburbs.

The bridge opened in April 2016 and replaced another floating bridge of the same name at the site, which was  shorter.

Background

The original Evergreen Point Floating Bridge, also named for state governor Albert D. Rosellini, opened on August 28, 1963, carrying the four-lane State Route 520 (at the time designated temporarily as the Evergreen Point branch of Primary State Highway 1 until the 1964 state highway renumbering). The  floating span consisted of 33 pontoons and cost $24.7 million to construct (equivalent to $ in ); the bridge carried four lanes of traffic, separated by a curb that was later replaced with a simple Jersey barrier; at the center was a drawspan that opened for large vessels traversing the lake.

Due to increased traffic generated by rapid growth of the Eastside area, bridge replacement was explored as early as 1969, when building a parallel span was explored and rejected. The Eastside is also served by the Interstate 90 floating bridges completed in 1940 and 1989, carrying traffic across Mercer Island to and from Bellevue.

The original Evergreen Point Floating Bridge was designed before the implementation of modern earthquake engineering standards, with vulnerabilities in its hollow support structures that could have failed in a major earthquake. Additionally, near the end of its lifetime, vibrations induced by storm surges and strong winds were able to compromise the aging drawspan, anchor cables, and pontoons, leading to structural failure in a major storm. Even if the storms were below the maximum threshold for failure to occur, Washington State Department of Transportation (WSDOT) would still close the floating bridge to traffic. Although the original bridge carried two lanes of traffic in each direction, it did not include shoulders or pedestrian and bicycle infrastructure. The lack of a shoulder led to traffic congestion in the event of an accident, which would block one or two lanes in a given direction and block emergency services from accessing the bridge.

Planning
Planning of the replacement bridge started in 1997 with a cross-lake study conducted by the state Department of Transportation. The study followed several others in the late 20th century to find solutions to traffic on the SR 520 floating bridge, with most proposals rejected after heavy opposition from communities on both ends of the bridge.

The final environmental impact statement for the project was issued in 2011, allowing for construction of the pontoons to begin the following year.

Funding
Funding was allocated to major phases of the project at different times. The western portions of the project, in the City of Seattle, were the last to be funded. The $4.5 billion in funding comes largely from the state gas tax earmarked for highways, tolling, and Federal highway funds.

In 2014, the budget for the project was increased by $250 million to cover cost overruns.

Construction

The first stage of the SR 520 floating bridge replacement project was the construction of 77 concrete pontoons in 2011 and 2012 by Kiewit-General-Manson at two purpose-built facilities in Aberdeen and Tacoma. The pontoons were floated to the bridge on Lake Washington via the Lake Washington Ship Canal. Pontoon assembly and fastening, to form the floating bridge's deck, began in 2014 and concluded in July 2015.

In 2012, WSDOT identified cracks and other problems with the first batch of completed pontoons, estimating that it would cost $400 million to repair cracks and other flaws that would bring down the bridge's predicted lifespan below the desired 75 years. The problems stemmed from shortcuts allegedly taken by contractors to complete pontoons to meet set deadlines; the proposed solutions to fix the pontoons included adding high-tension steel cables and post-tensioning of the concrete. A floating,  cofferdam was launched in November 2013 to assist in repairs of the pontoons, functioning as a portable drydock that wrapped around parts of the pontoons. The repairs were made by contractors from December 2013 to June 2014 and cost a total of approximately $208 million, using up the majority of the program's reserve funds. As a result of the pontoon issues, the estimated opening of the bridge was pushed back from December 2014 into 2016.

Construction of the bridge deck, beginning with the eastern approach in Medina, began in March 2012.

In March 2015, two construction accidents on the bridge slowed construction for reevaluation of safety measures: a contractor was killed after a high fall on the east highrise; and a crane-lifted load of steel pipes swung out of control into a King County Metro bus and an overhead highway sign.

The bridge deck was lifted into place in August 2015, and the final concrete pour was finished in October 2015, completing the bridge deck.

Design
The new bridge was designed to be more stable in stronger winds and raised the bridge deck much higher above the surface of the lake than the old bridge. This design now includes shoulders and a protected pedestrian and bicycle path across the viaduct.

Maintenance building
The bridge features advanced monitoring devices and new maintenance facilities. Beneath the bridge is a three-story high brick building used to control and monitor various life support and utility systems on the bridge. A backup generator sits on the ground level to power all systems in case of power loss. Behind the back wall of the building lies a massive retaining wall built in response to steep hills.

Pontoons and anchors
The floating bridge is laid atop 77 concrete pontoons that float above the water and are secured by 58 anchors to the lake bottom.

All the pontoons are designed with watertight compartments that are monitored remotely with sensors to detect leaks that could lead to catastrophic failure.

The bridge's 58 anchors all feature ,  steel cables and are divided into three types: 45  fluke anchors used in softer soils deep in the lakebed; eight  gravity anchors used in solid soils nearer to the shore; and five ,  drilled shaft anchors used in conjunction with the gravity anchors to prevent navigation hazards.

To ensure storm resistance in the event of water seeping into the pontoons, each pontoon is outfitted with a leak detection system with a float switch that sits about 3 inches off the floor. If the pontoon is breached, an alarm will sound inside the maintenance building. From there, a pump can be lowered into the chamber and controlled from the deck above.

Bridge deck
Unlike the older bridge, maintenance vehicles can now access the pontoons from beneath the upper roadway deck without interrupting traffic. According to a project engineer on the site, the deck had to be structurally isolated from the main support structure using a damping system to ensure seismic resistance up to a magnitude 9 earthquake to comply with local building codes. The original deck design called for three support columns but was later revised to two due to aesthetic issues. Moreover, the lighting mounted on top of the deck had to be positioned to minimize light pollution as well as its effect on aquatic habitat.

Layout
The bridge has two general purpose lanes and one high-occupancy vehicle lane (HOV lane) per direction. It includes shoulders and a  pedestrian/bicycle path on the north side, unlike the 1963 bridge. Congestion on the old bridge was blamed on lack of shoulders, where disabled vehicles would cause severe backups.

Public transportation
Public transportation and high-occupancy vehicle (HOV) use were incorporated in the bridge design. The bridge includes HOV lanes with priority for transit. A 2008 WSDOT report included five core bus rapid transit routes proposed by Sound Transit connecting the Eastside (Kirkland, Redmond, and Bellevue) to Downtown Seattle and the University District, with a base frequency of 15 minutes, increasing up to 7 minutes at peak times.

Existing freeway bus stations (also known as "flyer stops") on the Eastside at Evergreen Point and Yarrow Point were rebuilt and moved from the freeway's shoulder to the median, accompanied by landscaped lids with parking and lawns, in 2014 for increased compatibility with the bridge's planned HOV lanes.

Tolling
Electronic tolling with the "Good to Go" system on the old bridge began in 2011; tolling on the new bridge was in place from its opening in 2016. The tolls are projected to generate $1.2 billion by 2056 to pay off bonds for the project as well as bridge operations and maintenance, debt service, future repairs, insurance, and deferred sales tax.  The toll varies by time of day as well as day of week and applies in each direction.  Rates are reviewed annually to cover all operational costs and debt service.  For standard two axle passenger vehicles, the rate tops out  at $4.30 during commuting hours ($2 additional for pay by mail) from a minimum of $1.25 between 11 p.m. and 5 a.m.  Major holidays are assessed at the weekend rate.  More than two axle vehicles are surcharged $2.15 per axle.

Opening and removal of old bridge

The new bridge was dedicated on April 2, 2016, in a ceremony presided over by Governor of Washington Jay Inslee and attended by an estimated 40,000 to 50,000 people. The ceremony also included a community fun run and walk on the bridge, and a bicycle ride hosted by the Cascade Bicycle Club on the bridge and the Interstate 5 express lanes the following day.

Traffic on the new bridge was shifted over in two stages, beginning with westbound traffic on April 11 and ending with eastbound traffic on April 25. The new westbound approach bridge opened in August 2017, with later revisions to extend the HOV lane towards the Montlake interchange. The bridge's multi-use bike and pedestrian path partially opened in July 2016, with access to the completed sections for an "out-and-back" experience, and fully opened on December 20, 2017.

Shortly after the opening of the bridge's westbound lanes, the Washington State Transportation Commission proposed increasing toll rates to introduce nighttime tolling by 2017. The toll rate increase and nighttime toll was approved by the commission and implemented on July 1, 2017.

The old bridge was planned to be decommissioned by floating away pontoons to an industrial site in Kenmore for disposal and recycling; in March 2016, the city rejected the plan, citing the possible release of toxins in the pontoon's concrete. The pontoons were sold to a recycling company based in Gig Harbor which plans to reuse the individual pontoons for floating decks and other projects. An unaffiliated contest was held in 2012 seeking ideas for the 33 pontoons of the old bridge, with solutions ranging from a "floating High Line" to partial submersion for walking paths. The first pontoon of the old bridge to be disassembled was towed through the Lake Washington Ship Canal in July 2016. As of December 2020, several pontoons of the old bridge are anchored in the Pitt River, in Pitt Meadows, British Columbia, Canada.

Awards
In April 2017, the bridge project was awarded the 2017 Grand Conceptor Award from the American Council of Engineering Companies (ACEC).

References

External links
SR 520 Bridge Replacement and HOV Program 
SR 520 Project Library
Project Booklet

2016 establishments in Washington (state)
Bridges completed in 2016
Bridges in Seattle
Road bridges in Washington (state)
Seattle metropolitan area
Toll bridges in Washington (state)
Bridges in King County, Washington
Concrete bridges in the United States
Pontoon bridges in the United States